Dizzy's Party is an album by Dizzy Gillespie recorded in 1976 and released on the Pablo label.

Reception
The Allmusic review called the album "A fairly standard date from Dizzy Gillespie's mid-'70s tenure at Pablo Records, Dizzy's Party is primarily a straightforward bop session, with the trumpeter backed by a simple sax/guitar/bass/drums quartet, plus Brazilian percussionist... Dizzy's Party is fine stuff that occasionally approaches excellence".

Track listing
All compositions by Dizzy Gillespie except as indicated
 "Dizzy's Party" (Rodney Jones) - 9:44 
 "Shim Sham Shimmy on the St. Louis Blues" (W. C. Handy) - 7:05 
 "Harlem Samba" (Laurindo Almeida, Gillespie) - 3:29 
 "Land of Milk and Honey" - 12:32

Personnel
Dizzy Gillespie – trumpet
Ray Pizzi – tenor saxophone, soprano saxophone, flute
Rodney Jones – guitar
Benjamin Franklin Brown – electric bass 
Mickey Roker – drums 
Paulinho Da Costa – percussion

References 

Pablo Records albums
Dizzy Gillespie albums
Albums produced by Norman Granz
1977 albums